Lightning Dust is a Canadian indie rock band formed in 2007 and based in Vancouver, British Columbia. The band is a side project of Amber Webber and Joshua Wells, both members of Black Mountain.

History
Wells and Webber formed Lightning Dust and began creating a sound that was softer and more melodic than Black Mountain's hard rock, with haunting, minimalist instrumentation and spooky, goth-like lyrics written by Webber. The band released its self-titled debut album on Jagjaguwar in 2007. The song "Wind Me Up" was featured as the free "Single of the Week" in the iTunes music store in Canada.

Another album, Infinite Light, was released in August 2009. The band performed at Matt Groening's All Tomorrow's Parties festival in May 2010 in Minehead, England.

A third album, Fantasy, which featured synthesized music, drumming, some industrial instrumental work, all accompanying the band's spooky songs, was released June 25, 2013. This album included the song "Loaded Gun"; in 2014 it was used in Quebecois television series Série noire, on SRC.

They released a fourth album on 4 October 2019, named Spectre. They have released three singles from the album: "Devoted To", "Led Astray", and "A Pretty Picture".

Discography
 Lightning Dust (2007)
 Infinite Light (2009)
 Fantasy (2013)
 Spectre (2019)

See also

Music of Canada
Music of Vancouver
Canadian rock
List of Canadian musicians
List of bands from Canada
List of bands from British Columbia
:Category:Canadian musical groups

References

External links
 Lightning Dust

Musical groups established in 2007
Canadian indie rock groups
Musical groups from Vancouver
2007 establishments in British Columbia
Jagjaguwar artists